This is a list of the Schools and colleges in Virudhunagar district.

Schools
 Minerva Public School Aruppukottai
 South Street Hindu Nadar Higher Secondary School

Engineering Colleges
 Renganayagi Varatharaj College of Engineering, Sivakasi 
 Kamaraj College of Engineering and Technology, Virudhunagar.
 PSRR Engineering College for women, Sivakasi.
 Arulmigu Kalasalingam university, Krishnankoil, Srivilliputhur.
 Sethu Institute of Technology, Pulloor, Kariapatti, Virudhunagar.
 Mepco Schlenk Engineering College, Sivakasi.
 Ramco Institute of Technology, Rajapalayam

References 

Virudhunagar
Education in Virudhunagar district